A War Named Desire is a 2000 Hong Kong action film co-written and directed by Alan Mak and starring Francis Ng, Daniel Chan, Pace Wu, Sam Lee, David Lee, Dave Wang and Gigi Leung.

Plot
Charles (Francis Ng) and James (Daniel Chan) are two brothers who lived with their grandmother during childhood. When Charles was eight years old, he committed an unexpected and unforgivable mistake, where he took HK$50,000 of cash from his grandmother's home and disappeared afterwards. James has held the grudge on his elder brother for his departure, not only for the fact that he took their grandmother's money, but mainly due to fact that his brother abandoned him without notice.

As the years go by, James has grown up and has met a good girlfriend, Jess (Pace Wu), while on the other hand, James became a member of a triad gang in Thailand, and is dating his triad brother, York's (Dave Wang) sister, Snow (Gigi Leung). After his grandmother dies, James finally have the opportunity to face down his past demon and he travels to Thailand with Jess to look for his brother.

Cast
Francis Ng as Charles Fong
Daniel Chan as James Fong
Dave Wang as York
Gigi Leung as Snow
David Lee as Henry Hung
Sam Lee as Keith
Pace Wu as Jess
Grace Lam as Chan Pui-sze
Chan Yiu-ming as Master Sun
Zhou Shu-yuan as Master King
Wasun Sakulponh as King's bodyguard
Venna Rujirosakul as Ken
Anusak Mekseree as Ming
Vassana Namund as Keith's dancer girlfriend
Archara Khantadat as Keith's dancer girlfriend
Wong Wai-fai as Thug
Keung Hak-shing as Thug

Theme song
I Miss Her (我想她)
Composer: China Huang
Lyricist: Wu Hsiung
Singer: Dave Wang

Reception

Critical
LoveHKFilm gave the film a positive review praising the performances of Francis Ng and Gigi Leung, and director Alan Mak for allowing each character to have their own moments. So Good Reviews also gave the film a positive review, praising Mak's ability to accomplish visual storytelling, the cinematography by Chan Chi-ying, Nicky Li's action chorgoraphy and Ng's subtle performance.

Box office
The film grossed HK$2,269,655 at the Hong Kong box office during its theatrical run from 9 to 27 April 2000.

Accolades

References

External links

A War Named Desire at Hong Kong Cinemagic

2000 films
2000 action films
Hong Kong action films
Triad films
Gun fu films
2000s Cantonese-language films
Films directed by Alan Mak
Films set in Hong Kong
Films shot in Hong Kong
Films set in Thailand
Films shot in Thailand
2000s Hong Kong films